Public security bureau may refer to:

Public security bureau (China), government office essentially acting as a police station or a local or provincial police
 Beijing Municipal Public Security Bureau
Tokyo Metropolitan Police Department Public Security Bureau, bureau of the Tokyo Metropolitan Police Department in charge of public security
North Korean public security bureau, law enforcement in North Korea